San Pablo is a canton in the Heredia province of Costa Rica. The head city is in San Pablo district.

History 
San Pablo was created on 18 July 1961 by decree 2789.

Geography 
San Pablo has an area of  km² and a mean elevation of  metres.

The canton is in the foothills southeast of the provincial capital city of Heredia, with the Bermúdez River as the southeast boundary and the Pirro River delineating the farthest portion of the northwestern border.

Districts 
The canton of San Pablo is subdivided into the following districts:
 San Pablo
 Rincón de Sabanilla

Demographics 

For the 2011 census, San Pablo had a population of  inhabitants.

Transportation

Road transportation 
The canton is covered by the following road routes:

Rail transportation 
The Interurbano Line operated by Incofer goes through this canton.

References 

Cantons of Heredia Province
Populated places in Heredia Province